This is a list of songs written about the city of Birmingham, Alabama:

 "Birmingham, Alabama" by Harry Belafonte and R. B. Greaves
 "Birmingham Bertha" by Ethel Waters (1929) (from On with the Show!)
 "Birmingham Black Bottom" by Charlie Johnson (1927)
 "Birmingham Blues" by Edith Wilson, Fats Waller (and many others) (1921)
 "Birmingham Blues" by The Charlie Daniels Band (1997)
 "Birmingham Bounce" by Tommy Dorsey (1946)
 "Birmingham Breakdown" by Duke Ellington (1926)
 "Birmingham Bus Station" by Charlie Daniels Band (1994)
 "Birmingham Daddy" by Gene Autry
 "Birmingham Jail" by Lead Belly
 "Birmingham Shadows" by Bruce Cockburn (1995)
 "Birmingham Sunday" by Richard Farina, recorded by Joan Baez
 "Birmingham Turnaround" by Keith Whitley
 "Birmingham" by Amanda Marshall
 "Birmingham" by Drive-By Truckers (2002)
 "Birmingham" by Randy Newman
 "Birmingham" by Shovels & Rope (2012)
 "Boulder to Birmingham" by Emmylou Harris
 "Breakfast in Birmingham" by David Lee Murphy
 "Down and Out in Birmingham" by Pirates of the Mississippi
 "Hello Birmingham" by Ani DiFranco
 "I Got a Man in a 'Bama Mine" by Merline Johnson (1937)
 "Mining Camp Blues" by Trixie Smith (1925)
 "Notifier Birmingham" by The Mountain Goats (1995)
 "Paint Me a Birmingham" by Tracy Lawrence (2004)
 "Postmarked Birmingham" by Blackhawk
 "Pratt City Blues" by Jabo Williams (1932)
 "Sparrows over Birmingham" by Josh Rouse
 "Sweet Birmingham" by Robert Moore (first recorded by Taj Mahal)
 "Sweet Home Alabama" by Lynyrd Skynyrd (1974)
 "Talking Birmingham Jam" by Phil Ochs (1965)
 "The Old Iron Hills" by Maylene and the Sons of Disaster
 "Train to Birmingham" by John Hiatt
 "Tuxedo Junction" by Erskine Hawkins
 "When Jesus Left Birmingham" by John Mellencamp (1993)

Birmingham is also mentioned in the following:

 "Alabama Chicken" by Sean Hayes (2003)
 “Birmingham” by Zach Bryan (2020)
 "Black Betty" by Huddie Ledbetter/Ram Jam
 "Cities" by Talking Heads (1979)
 "Gun Street Girl" by Tom Waits (1985)
 "Hey Hey Hey Hey (Going back to Birmingham)" by Bob Seger
 "Hey, Hey, Hey, Hey" by Little Richard
 "I Can't Love You Anymore" by Lyle Lovett
 “I Wish Grandpas Never Died” by Riley Green (2019)
 "If It Hadn't Been For Love" by The Steeldrivers (2008)
 "I've Made Up My Mind to Give Myself to You" by Bob Dylan (2020)
 "Jacob's Ladder" by Bruce Hornsby (first recorded by Huey Lewis and the News) (1987)
 "Maribel" by Andy Offutt Irwin
 "Old Iron Hills" by Maylene And The Sons Of Disaster (2009)
 "One of These Days" by Drive-By Truckers
 "Playboy Mommy" by Tori Amos  (1998)
 "Postmarked, Birmingham" by Blackhawk
 "Promised Land" by Chuck Berry (later remade as a 1975 hit for Elvis Presley)
 "Rip This Joint" by The Rolling Stones (1972)
 "Run Baby Run" by Sheryl Crow (1993)
 "Southern Hospitality" by Trinity the Tuck (2022)
 "Stars Fell on Alabama" by Frank Perkins/Mitchell Parish (1934)
 "Sweet Home Alabama" by Lynyrd Skynyrd
 "Swordfishtrombone" by Tom Waits (1983)

Black Betty
Song by Ram Jam

References

 "Directory of African-Appalachian musicians" (March 22, 2004) Black Music Research Journal

Birmingham, Alabama
songs
 Birmingham, Alabama
Songs